In financial econometrics (the application of statistical methods to economic data), the Markov-switching multifractal (MSM) is a model of asset returns developed by Laurent E. Calvet and Adlai J. Fisher that incorporates stochastic volatility components of heterogeneous durations. MSM captures the outliers, log-memory-like volatility persistence and power variation of financial returns. In currency and equity series, MSM compares favorably with standard volatility models such as GARCH(1,1) and FIGARCH both in- and out-of-sample. MSM is used by practitioners in the financial industry to forecast volatility, compute value-at-risk, and price derivatives.

MSM specification 

The MSM model can be specified in both discrete time and continuous time.

Discrete time 

Let  denote the price of a financial asset, and let  denote the return over two consecutive periods. In MSM, returns are specified as

 
Volatility is driven by the first-order latent Markov state vector:

Given the volatility state , the next-period multiplier  is drawn from a fixed distribution  with probability , and is otherwise left unchanged.

{| 
|-
|  drawn from distribution  || with probability 
|-
|  || with probability 
|}
 
The transition probabilities are specified by

.

The sequence  is approximately geometric  at low frequency.

Binomial MSM 
The return process  is then specified by the parameters . Note that the number of parameters is the same for all  .

Continuous time 

MSM is similarly defined in continuous time. The price process follows the diffusion:

 
Each component follows the dynamics:

{| 
|-
|  drawn from distribution  || with probability 
|-
|  || with probability 
|}

The intensities vary geometrically with :

When the number of components  goes to infinity, continuous-time MSM converges to a multifractal diffusion, whose sample paths take a continuum of local Hölder exponents on any finite time interval.

Inference and closed-form likelihood 

When  has a discrete distribution, the Markov state vector  takes finitely many values . For instance, there are  possible states in binomial MSM. The Markov dynamics are characterized by the transition matrix  with components .
Conditional on the volatility state, the return  has Gaussian density

Conditional distribution

Closed-form Likelihood 
The log likelihood function has the following analytical expression:

 
Maximum likelihood provides reasonably precise estimates in finite samples.

Other estimation methods 
When  has a continuous distribution, estimation can proceed by simulated method of moments, or simulated likelihood via a particle filter.

Forecasting 

Given , the conditional distribution of the latent state vector at date  is given by:

 
MSM often provides better volatility forecasts than some of the best traditional models both in and out of sample. Calvet and Fisher report considerable gains in exchange rate volatility forecasts at horizons of 10 to 50 days as compared with GARCH(1,1), Markov-Switching GARCH, and Fractionally Integrated GARCH. Lux obtains similar results using linear predictions.

Applications

Multiple assets and value-at-risk 
Extensions of MSM to multiple assets provide reliable estimates of the value-at-risk in a portfolio of securities.

Asset pricing 
In financial economics, MSM has been used to analyze the pricing implications of multifrequency risk. The models have had some success in explaining the excess volatility of stock returns compared to fundamentals and the negative skewness of equity returns. They have also been used to generate multifractal jump-diffusions.

Related approaches 

MSM is a stochastic volatility model with arbitrarily many frequencies. MSM builds on the convenience of regime-switching models, which were advanced in economics and finance by James D. Hamilton. 
MSM is closely related to the Multifractal Model of Asset Returns. MSM improves on the MMAR's combinatorial construction by randomizing arrival times, guaranteeing a strictly stationary process. 
MSM provides a pure regime-switching formulation of multifractal measures, which were pioneered by Benoit Mandelbrot.

See also 
Brownian motion
Rogemar Mamon
Markov chain
Multifractal model of asset returns
Multifractal
Stochastic volatility

References

External links
 Financial Time Series, Multifractals and Hidden Markov Models

Mathematical finance
Markov models
Fractals